Peter Boykin (born May 13, 1977) is a Constitutionalist, American political commentator, citizen journalist, podcaster, author, and Political Candidate for Lieutenant Governor of North Carolina in 2024. In November 2022, Peter Boykin Declared He Is Running For the 2024 North Carolina lieutenant gubernatorial election. Peter Boykin is also known for being the founder and serves as president of Gays for Trump.

Early life and education
Peter Boykin was born in Florida and grew up in Virginia. He now resides in North Carolina. His parents were conservative Catholics who campaigned for Ronald Reagan.

He holds an associate degree in information systems technology from Danville Community College, a Bachelor of Science in web development, a Master of Science (M.S.) in information security and assurance from Purdue University, and a M.S. in e-commerce and entrepreneurship from Purdue.

Political career
Boykin is a public supporter of Donald Trump.  In 2016, he founded the Gays for Trump organization which gained national attention as it solicited support from gay Americans for the candidacy of Donald Trump, mainly through social media messaging and outreach. Gays for Trump also organized events, like the “WAKE UP!” party at the 2016 Republican National Convention to celebrate Trump's nomination as the Republican Party candidate. In attendance were prominent far-right figures, such as former Breitbart news editor Milo Yiannopoulos.

North Carolina Lieutenant Governor Candidacy

Peter Boykin is a Political Candidate for Lieutenant Governor of North Carolina in 2024. 

In November 2022, Peter Boykin Declared He Is Running For the 2024 North Carolina lieutenant gubernatorial election.

North Carolina House Candidacy

In February 2018, he announced that he was running for the North Carolina House of Representatives to represent District 58. After advancing from the primary election on May 8, 2018, and receiving the backing of the North Carolina Republican Party, he lost in the general election on November 6, 2018 to the North Carolina Democratic Party candidate, Amos Quick by a margin of more than 50 percentage points.

In 2022, Peter Boykin ran for North Carolina House of Representatives House District 63; he failed to advance to the general election.

Congressional Candidacy
In May 2021, he announced that he was running for US Congress to represent North Carolina after incumbent Ted Budd announced his departure from Congress to run for the Senate seat vacated by Richard Burr.

In November 2021, Boykin announced his intention to run in the newly formed 7th Congressional District. However, Boykin later suspended his congressional campaign, instead opting to run for the North Carolina House of Representatives.

Note, Peter Boykin dropped from running for US CONGRESS to run for a North Carolina State House position due to map changes in his district.

Podcasting and Activism
Peter Boykin is an avid Podcaster, and Citizen Journalist for GoRightNews.com  who contributes to and organizes rallies, and runs a movement called the #GoRight movement.

Rallies and events
After the election of Donald Trump, Boykin planned and hosted the "Gay" DeploraBall presidential inauguration event in Maryland, on the night of President Trump's inauguration.

There was a series of more than two dozen demonstrations organized throughout the United States on March 4, 2017, in support of President Trump. Boykin helped organize and ran the March 4 Trump event in Washington, D.C., at which Joy Villa and Andre Soriano were keynote speakers 

In 2017 the organization Gays for Trump organized a "Make America Great Again Free Speech Rally" on the National Mall near the White House on Saturday, July 1, which 18 people attended. Boykin blamed the low turnout on people celebrating the July 4 holiday weekend.

Also in 2017, Boykin was the local coordinator for the Raleigh, North Carolina anti-sharia rally, one of a series organized nationally by ACT for America. Although exact counts were difficult to gauge, the fifty or so people gathered for the anti-sharia event were outnumbered by counter-protesters by a factor of five or six.

In the same year, he was a featured speaker at the Mother of All Rallies in Washington, D.C.

In 2018 Boykin held a second March 4 Trump rally at the Lincoln Memorial in Washington, D.C.  The Washington Blade reported that about 100 people showed up around noon to the rally at the Lincoln Memorial, but then only 25 stuck around to march towards the White House after that.

He also makes regular appearances at his local Greensboro city hall to talk about various topics.

In July 2019, Boykin gave a speech at the "Demand Free Speech" rally held by the far-right Proud Boys organization in Washington, D.C., where he asked the crowd whether they’d be willing to "lay down your digital lives" to fight for freedom.

In July 2021, Boykin held an "American Pride Month" rally for the Peter Boykin For US Congress Campaign and The Triad Patriots in Graham, North Carolina, where he called for July to be honored as American Pride Month to honor All Americans.

Alleged attack by Antifa and Black Lives Matter

In 2017 Boykin claimed that he was attacked by Antifa protesters and a Black Lives Matter individual while covering the aftermath of the Unite the Right rally in Durham, North Carolina, and the vandalism and removal of the Confederate Soldiers Monument in Durham, North Carolina. However, no evidence exists to corroborate his claims.

LGBT issues
A self-proclaimed “proud gay Republican,” Boykin urged Americans to “get out of the bed and vote.”

Boykin has publicly stated, “Straight, gay, bi, transgender, Democrat, liberal, Republican, conservative, Libertarian… I don’t care, I am your representative.”

In a 2018 interview in The Daily Beast, Boykin expressed support for President Trump's ban on transgender people serving in the United States military.

The outlet LGBTQ Nation declared Boykin "dangerous to trans people,” a claim that Boykin has denied.

In May 2021, Peter Boykin Founded Gay Conservatives of America.

See also
 LGBT conservatism in the United States
 LGBT conservatism
 LGBT protests against Donald Trump
 Gays for Trump
 2022 United States House of Representatives elections
 North Carolina House of Representatives

References

Further reading
 
 *

External links

  PeterBoykin.com
  Boykin4NC.com
  GoRightNews.com
  GaysForTrump.org
  GayConservativesOfAmerica.com

1977 births
Living people
20th-century American people
21st-century American writers
21st-century Roman Catholics
Free speech activists
American gay writers
LGBT conservatism in the United States
LGBT Roman Catholics
Male critics of feminism
Presidency of Donald Trump
Purdue University alumni
North Carolina Republicans
Roman Catholic activists
Activists from North Carolina